Bibra Lake is a freshwater lake in the suburb of Bibra Lake, located south of the central business district of Perth, the capital of Western Australia. The suburb and lake are located within the City of Cockburn local government area. It is bounded by the Roe Highway reservation to the north, Stock Road to the west, the Kwinana Freeway to the east and the freight rail line to the south.
 
Bibra Lake is the fourth lake (going north to south) of a string of lakes which combined comprise the Beeliar Regional Park. Bibra Lake contains two electric insect traps designed to reduce the number of mosquitoes in the area. Around the lake is a cycle way, which provides access to bird hides.

See also

 List of lakes of Western Australia

References

Lakes of Perth, Western Australia
Beeliar Regional Park